Bishop Shyamal Bose is the current serving bishop of the Roman Catholic Diocese of Baruipur, India.

Early life and education 
Bose was born on 24 March 1961 in Gosaba, West Bengal, India. He studied at St. Xavier's F P School, in Basantithe and Gosaba for his primary and secondary school education. For minor seminary he joined St. John Mary Vianney Minor Seminary in Barasat, and  the Morning Star Regional Major Seminary in Barrackpore, Kolkata. He attended St. Albert's College, Ranchi, Jharkhand for his theological studies.

He acquired a Licentiate in Biblical Theology from St. Peter's Pontifical Institute, Bengaluru.

Priesthood 
Bose was ordained a priest for the Diocese of Baruipur on 5 May 1991.

Episcopate 
On 17 May 2019, Bose was appointed the Coadjutor Bishop of the Roman Catholic Diocese of Baruipur by Pope Francis, and consecrated by Archbishop Thomas D’Souza on 24 June 2019. He is also serving as a Financial Administrator and Chancellor of the Diocese of Baruipur since 2016. He succeeded as bishop of the Roman Catholic diocese of Baruipur on 4 May 2020.

References 

1961 births
21st-century Roman Catholic bishops in India
Living people